Roy Black may refer to:

 Roy Black (attorney) (born 1945), American criminal defense attorney and law professor
 Roy Black (singer) (1943–1991), German singer and actor
 Roy Turnbull Black (1888–1962), American chess player
 Roy Keith Black (1927–2009), British-born businessman in Ireland